Jules Kesteloot was a Belgian fencer. He competed in the individual and team sabre events at the 1928 Summer Olympics.

References

External links
 

Year of birth missing
Possibly living people
Belgian male sabre fencers
Olympic fencers of Belgium
Fencers at the 1928 Summer Olympics